Seguenzia elegans is a species of sea snail, a marine gastropod mollusk in the family Seguenziidae.

Description
The size of the shell varies between 3 mm and 4.3 mm. The base is perforated or umbilicated. The fissure of the outer lip is close to the suture. The columella is produced below. The aperture is broadly truncately sinuous on the base.

Distribution
This species occurs in the Atlantic Ocean off the Bay of Biscay, Madeira, Bermuda; also off Brazil and Argentine.

References

 Jensen, R. H. (1997). A Checklist and Bibliography of the Marine Molluscs of Bermuda. Unp. , 547 pp 
 Gofas, S.; Le Renard, J.; Bouchet, P. (2001). Mollusca, in: Costello, M.J. et al. (Ed.) (2001). European register of marine species: a check-list of the marine species in Europe and a bibliography of guides to their identification. Collection Patrimoines Naturels, 50: pp. 180–213
 Sysoev A.V. (2014). Deep-sea fauna of European seas: An annotated species check-list of benthic invertebrates living deeper than 2000 m in the seas bordering Europe. Gastropoda. Invertebrate Zoology. Vol.11. No.1: 134–155

External links
 Jeffreys, J. G. (1885). On the Mollusca procured during the 'Lightning' and 'Porcupine' expeditions, 1868-70 (Part IX). Proceedings of the Zoological Society of London. 1885 : 27-63, pl. 4-6
  Serge GOFAS, Ángel A. LUQUE, Joan Daniel OLIVER,José TEMPLADO & Alberto SERRA (2021) - The Mollusca of Galicia Bank (NE Atlantic Ocean); European Journal of Taxonomy 785: 1–114</ref>
 Salvador, R. B.; Cavallari, D. C.; Simone, L. R. L. (2014). Seguenziidae (Gastropoda: Vetigastropoda) from SE Brazil collected by the Marion Dufresne (MD55) expedition. Zootaxa. 3878(6): 536
 

elegans
Gastropods described in 1885